The Coca-Cola Red Sparks was a Japanese company-owned rugby union team based in Fukuoka city, Kyūshū.

The team was initially founded as Kitakyushu Coca-Cola and then changed its name to Coca-Cola West Japan.

The team won promotion to the expanded Top League of 14 teams at the end of the 2005–06 season, and was renamed Coca-Cola West Red Sparks. The club motto is "Have Guts Have Glory" and their slogan for 2006 season: "Always Attack & Aggressive". In the fourth Top League (2006–07) the team came 10th, with four wins, nine losses and 21 points. It therefore did not need to take part in any play-offs. Sanix, the local rivals, came ninth.

The team was promoted from the Kyūshū league to the Top League in 2013, and was renamed the Coca-Cola Red Sparks for the 2013–14 season. Following six seasons in the top flight, they were relegated back to the Top Kyūshū League after the 2018–19 season.

On 30 April 2021, it was announced that the Red Sparks would disband as a rugby club at the conclusion of the 2021 Top Challenge League Season. It had previously agreed to join the new 25-team domestic competition in Japan before withdrawal.

Final squad

The Coca-Cola Red Sparks squad for the 2021 season was:

Former

George Leaupepe - Centre
Luke Andrews - No.8
Mark Ranby - Centre
Benjamin Jones - Full Back
Soushi Fuchigami - Fly Half
Glenn Paterson - Fly Half
Nick Cummins - Wing
Sam Afro Wykes - Second row

Coaches

 Earl Va'a 2017–present

See also
Top League Challenge series

References

External links

Rugby in Kyushu
Rugby clubs established in 1966
Sports teams in Fukuoka, Fukuoka
Red Sparks
1966 establishments in Japan
Japanese rugby union teams
Rugby clubs disestablished in 2021
2021 disestablishments in Japan